The  was a set of reactions and events surrounding the sinking of a British merchant vessel named Normanton off the coast of what is now Japan's Wakayama Prefecture on October 24, 1886.  When the Normanton ran aground, the ship's officers appear to have seized the lifeboats for the Europeans alone. Among the Asians aboard (Indian and Chinese crew, and the Japanese passengers) there were no survivors. Uproar in Japan obliged the British Consular Court to revisit its initial exoneration of the captain and to accept there had been criminal misconduct. But no compensation was offered. In Japan, the incident was widely interpreted as a further illustration of the humiliations visited upon the country since her forced opening to the West in the 1850s, and it led to new and persistent calls for the revision of the "unequal treaties".

Overview
On the evening of October 24, 1886, the 240-ton British cargo ship Normanton, registered to the Madamson & Bell Steamship Company, left Yokohama Harbor laden with both goods and 25 Japanese passengers for the port of Kobe. En route she was caught in heavy wind and rains all the way from Yokkaichi in Mie Prefecture to the Cape of Kashinozaki in Wakayama Prefecture, where the vessel was wrecked.  She ran aground on an offshore reef and was lost.  The ship's captain John William Drake and all of his European crew (consisting of Britons and Germans) escaped the sinking ship in lifeboats, leaving the remaining crewmen (twelve Indians and Chinese) and the 25 Japanese passengers aboard to escape by themselves. Drake and his European crewmen were picked up by coastal fishermen who took them in. Three of the survivors of the shipwreck died of hypothermia and were buried once the crew reached the shore. None of the 25 Japanese passengers aboard the Normanton survived.

On October 28, Inoue Kaoru, Minister for Foreign Affairs for Prime Minister Itō Hirobumi's first cabinet, received a telegram from Matsumoto Kanae, Governor of Wakayama Prefecture, briefly outlining the events surrounding the shipwreck.  He was alarmed by the fact that all the Japanese passengers were lost, and ordered an investigation of the situation on the spot. However, Japanese officials were hindered in their efforts to verify the facts of the incident by the legal barriers imposed by the unequal treaties.  Reportedly, they were never able to reach a satisfactory end to their investigation.

At a Marine Accident hearing at the British consulate in Kobe the following month, Captain Drake was declared innocent of any wrongdoing. James Troup, British Consul approved the following official statement on November 5: "The crew urged the Japanese passengers to get to the lifeboats as quickly as possible, but the Japanese failed to understand the English instructions.  In turn, they did not comply with the crew's wishes, but instead holed themselves up inside the ship and didn't even try to come out.  The crew had no choice but to the leave the Japanese and take to the lifeboats.  (Since the Normanton was a cargo ship, there was no staff in place to handle Japanese speaking passengers.)"  The captain and the crew were found not guilty by the investigation.

Public opinion in Japan was outraged over what was perceived to be a miscarriage of justice.  An example of public sentiment at the time was found in the Tokyo Nichi Nichi Shimbun (forerunner of the Mainichi Shimbun, founded in 1872.)  The paper reported in an outrage that, "If the Captain and the more than 20 seamen under him were able to be rescued, it makes sense that at least one or two Japanese passengers would have been saved along with them.  However, the ugly truth is all of them were lost."  In another article, they claimed that, "If the passengers had been Westerners, they would have been rescued immediately.  These men were left to die because they were Japanese".

The Japanese public continued to be outraged upon hearing the verdict.  The following ran in the Tokyo Nichi Nichi Shinbun, a paper that publicly protested the event in print: "No matter how ignorant you may think the Japanese are, to claim that they could stare into the face of danger and fail to recognize the gravity of the situation is absurd.  The idea that these people were too stupid to know how to save themselves or even get help from others is a grave fallacy."  Donations poured in from all over the country to support the families of the victims who lost their lives. Several newspapers covered nothing but stories about the incident for days on end, supported by mournful editorials and articles calling for the removal of the officials in question.  Japanese legal scholars accused Captain Drake of misconduct. Numerous politicians across the country called for a revision of the unequal treaties and used the incident as an opportunity to advance their political interests.

Some English-language newspapers were also shocked by the verdict.  The North China Herald in Shanghai called the decision of the Board of Enquiry a "farce", a "miscarriage of justice" and a "complete whitewash".

The Japanese government had gone great lengths in trying to re-negotiate the unequal treaties.  Foreign Minister Inoue had been a staunch supporter of the country's Europeanization by hosting elaborate balls at the Rokumeikan, however he could do nothing to silence the storm of domestic controversy rising across the land.

On November 13, he ordered the Governor of Hyogo Prefecture Utsumi Tadakatsu to prevent Captain Drake and crew from leaving Kobe's port, and brought charges of murder against the Captain and his men under the governor's name in the British Court for Japan in Yokohama (upper consular court).  The prosecution took place the following day on 14th.  The British held a preliminary hearing in Kobe, and then moved the case to Yokohama.  On December 8, Judge Hannen of the British Court for Japan in Yokohama found Drake guilty of criminal negligence, and sentenced him to three months imprisonment. However, the consular court rejected any compensation for the families of the victims.  In sentencing Drake, Judge Hannen told him: "We have been accustomed to expect from the merchant service of England heroism and devotion to the interests of the crew and passengers that I am afraid in this case were wanting."

Aftermath

The Japanese Solidarity Movement
The Normanton Incident fanned an increase in anti-British and anti-western sentiment in Japan, and was upheld as an example of the urgent need to revise the unequal treaties which Japan had signed with various foreign powers, especially with regards to clauses pertaining to extraterritoriality. The incident was picked up by the Solidarity Movement Party, then in its infant stages.  They raised the issue all across the land, criticizing Inoue's handling of the situation as "coquettish" and "cowardly" diplomacy.  As a result of this incident, the movement, which demanded foreign policy reform as well as the renegotian of the unequal treaties, was significantly strengthened.

Media

Theater and Print
After the incident, there were some who hoped to turn the incident into a drama for the theater, but the government, fearing another flare up of civil unrest, effectively shut down the operation.

At the same time, a book entitled "A Complete Guide to the Trial of the Events Surrounding the Sinking of the British Ship 'Normanton'" was published immediately after the incident occurred.  "The Court Records of the British Steamship "Normanton"" were also published the following year in 1887.

"The Normanton Sinks Beneath the Waves"
Immediately following the incident a song entitled "The Normanton Sinks Beneath the Waves" (Normanton-go chimbotsu no uta) was written anonymously and quickly caught on with people across the country.  There were originally only 36 stanzas to the song, but by the time the incident had come to a close the number had ballooned to 59.  The tune is set to the old military standard "With Swords Drawn" (original Japanese version: 抜刀隊, battōtai.)

The song begins with an opening:
The roar of the waves pounding against the shore 
Awoken from a dream by a storm in the dead of night 
Staring out at the great blue expanse 
Wondering where the hell my fellow countrymen are 

Try to call out, try to shout, but I have no voice 
I seek and search but find not even a shadow 
If the rumors are true, the passing moon 
and twenty-five of our dearest brethren set sail

Godspeed your journey as the crow flies 
We know a little bit about foreign ships 
And we know those built by Brits 
Are famed for their nautical prowess

Like lambs, we were led aboard the vessel 
we passed all too quickly the 300 kilometers 
of distant wake and water to old Totomi 
only to reach Kumano Inlet in Kishuu

and then in the middle takes a surprising turn:

O, the inhumanity of this foreign ship 
The cruel and merciless captain 
Whose very name reeks of cowardice 
Watched their sorrowful plight from afar

Forgetting all of his responsibility 
Hey made fast for a cowardly retreat 
Dragging his men along with him 
They jumped aboard the lifeboats

They see each others shadows off 
Tears of regret cutting quick and deep 
They wipe them down and fight them off 
You're a hateful bastard, Drake

No matter how different your race may be 
No matter how little you know of mercy 
You just stood by and watched 
You left us there to die, you coward

The above passage contains the opening of the song; the song itself goes on to elate on the legal aspect of the case.

Marine Rescue Japan
Influenced by the events surrounding the Normanton Incident, a volunteer-based marine rescue group known at the time as the Great Empire of Japan Marine Rescue Group was formed in 1889.  It is today known as "Marine Rescue Japan".

Further reading
 "The Events Surrounding the Passengers of the Sunken British Ship 'The Normanton'" (A Japanese Ministry of Foreign Relations Publication, 19)
 Kawai, Hikomasa "The Normanton Incident" (Ancient Japanese Documents Bulletins) 166
 Soga Ban, Editor "The Normanton Incident, the Court Records of the British Steam Ship" - Royal Library of Korea, 1887

Notes

Sources

References

 
 
 

 
 
 (Original research provided by the first Chairman of Marine Rescue Japan)

External links
 海難審判庁西洋形船船長運転手機関手免状規則時代(Normanton Incident) – A list of nautical incidents during the Meiji Era that were stoked by claims of racism.

Racism
Unequal treaties
Maritime incidents in Japan
Maritime incidents in October 1886
Shipwrecks of Japan
1886 in Japan
Scandals in Japan
Foreign relations of the Empire of Japan
Japan–United Kingdom relations
October 1886 events